José León Sánchez Alvarado (19 April 1929 – 15 November 2022) was a Costa Rican novelist best known for his works Isla de los hombres solos ("Island of Lonely Men") and Tenochtitlan. A movie adaptation of his novel, Isla de los hombres solos was made and released by a Mexican producer.

References

1929 births
2022 deaths
Costa Rican male short story writers
Costa Rican short story writers
Costa Rican male writers
People from Puntarenas Province